Ma Zhiyuan (1250–1321), courtesy name Dongli, Chinese dramatist, playwright, and poet during the Yuan dynasty.

Among his achievements is the development and popularizing of the sanqu lyric type of Classical Chinese poetry forms. The poem "Autumn Thoughts" from the book "" is the most widely known of his sanqu poems.

Works

Poems
Ma Zhiyuan's sanqu poem "Autumn Thoughts", composed to the metric pattern Tianjingsha, uses ten images in twenty-two monosyllables to preamble a state of emotion, and is considered as the penultimate piece in Chinese poetry to convey the typical Chinese male literati's melancholy during late autumn:

 Autumn Thoughts
 Over old trees wreathed with rotten vines fly evening crows;
 Under a small bridge near a cottage a stream flows;
 On ancient road in the west wind a lean horse goes.
 Westward declines the sun; Far, far from home is the heartbroken one.

Plays
Only seven of his 15 plays are extant, of which four have been translated into English: 
 Autumn in Han Palace,  (Full title: Breaking a Troubling Dream: A Lone Goose in Autumn over the Palaces of Han). This play tells the story of Han Emperor Yuandi and Wang Zhaojun, and is considered the best example of Yuan theatre.
 The Yellow-Millet Dream,  (Full title: On the Road to Handan, Awakening from a Dream Dreamt While Cooking Millet)
 Yueyang Tower,  (Full title: Lü Dongbin Gets Drunk Three Times in Yueyang Tower)
 Tears on the Blue Gown,  (Full title: The Overseer of Jiangzhou: Tears on the Blue Gown)
 
 
 

See also
Chinese Sanqu poetry
Qu (poetry)
Zaju

Notes

References
 Ci hai bian ji wei yuan hui (. Ci hai. Shanghai: Shanghai ci shu chu ban she, 1979.

External links
 

1270 births
1330 deaths
13th-century Chinese dramatists and playwrights
14th-century Chinese dramatists and playwrights
Poets from Beijing
Yuan dynasty dramatists and playwrights
Yuan dynasty poets